Mosselhalvøya is a peninsula in Ny-Friesland at Spitsbergen, Svalbard. It is located between Mosselbukta and Sorgfjorden. At the northern part of the peninsular is the coastal plain of Verlegenhukflya, with its northernmost point Verlegenhuken.

References

Peninsulas of Spitsbergen